Aurokra or Aurokla or Aurocla or Aulokra was a town of ancient Phrygia, inhabited during Roman and Byzantine times. It became a bishopric; no longer a residential bishopric, it remains, under the name Aurocla, a titular see of the Roman Catholic Church.

Its site is located above Dort Köy near Doğancık in Asiatic Turkey.

References

Populated places in Phrygia
Former populated places in Turkey
Roman towns and cities in Turkey
Populated places of the Byzantine Empire
History of Afyonkarahisar Province
Catholic titular sees in Asia